This is the list of the Border Guard agencies in different countries. Such agencies may also be known as Border Patrol, Border Police, Border Troops,  Frontier Guard or Frontier Police.

Asia

Bangladesh
Boarder Guard Bangladesh - Primary Boarder Sequiriy Force 
Bangladesh Customs

People's Republic of China
General Administration of Customs - Primary customs and excise agency.
 Ministry of Public Security 
National Immigration Administration -  China Immigration Inspection (CII)
 People's Armed Police - Border patrol and control functions in remote regions.

Hong Kong
 Hong Kong Immigration Department
 Hong Kong Customs & Excise

India
 Border Security Force – 245,000 personnel on the  Pakistan  and Bangladesh Border
 Indo-Tibetan Border Police – 77,000 personnel
 Rashtriya Rifles – 40,000 personnel in Kashmir
 Special Frontier Force – 10,000 personnel primarily used for conducting clandestine intelligence gathering and commando operations along the India Chinese border. Officially constrained from operating within 10 km of the international border
 Assam Rifles – 50,000 personnel organised into 46 battalions, an internal security force with secondary duties along the eastern borders.
 Sashastra Seema Bal  (SSB) 82,000 personnel on the Bhutan and Nepal borders

Indonesia
 Customs - oversee traffic of goods 
 Immigration - oversee traffic of people.
 Land Border : Border Patrol Task Force (Satuan Tugas Pengamanan Perbatasan abbreviated Satgas Pamtas), which consist of Infantry battalions from the Indonesian Army 
 Sea Border : Maritime Security Agency, Navy, Coast Guard, Maritime Police and Marine and Fisheries Resources Surveillance

Iran
 Border Guard Command

Israel
 Israel Border Police

Macau Special Administrative Region
 Public Security Police Force of Macau

Malaysia
 Malaysian Immigration Department
 Border Security Agency
 Malaysia Maritime Enforcement Agency

Pakistan
 Pakistan Customs operates on all Pakistani borders
 Frontier Corps Balochistan (North) on the central border with Afghanistan.
 Frontier Corps Balochistan (South) on the western border with Iran and the southwestern part of the border with Afghanistan
 Frontier Corps Khyber Pakhtunkhwa (North) on the northwestern border with Afghanistan
 Frontier Corps Khyber Pakhtunkhwa (South) on the central border with Afghanistan
 Gilgit Baltistan Scouts on the northeastern border with China and part of the Line of Control with Indian Kashmir
 Pakistan Coast Guards is a mainly land-based patrol force on the southern coast
 Pakistan Maritime Security Agency, a coast guard on the southern maritime border
 Punjab Rangers on the central eastern border with India
 Sindh Rangers on the south eastern border with India.

Singapore
 Immigration and Checkpoints Authority

South Korea
 Korea Immigration Service
 Korea Customs Service

Tajikistan
 Tajik Border Troops

Thailand
 Border Patrol Police
 Paramilitary Marine Regiment
 Thahan Phran

Turkey
 Department of Foreigners, Borders and Asylum
 Border Gendarmerie
 Coast Guard Command
 General Directorate of Customs Protection

Republic of China
 National Immigration Agency of the Ministry of the Interior of Taiwan Political Authority - Immigration and border security
 Customs Administration of Ministry of Finance - handles customs

United Arab Emirates 

 Critical Infrastructure & Coastal Protection Authority

Vietnam
 Vietnam Border Guard

Europe

European Union
 Frontex

Andorra
 Police Corps of Andorra

Belarus
 State Border Committee of the Republic of Belarus
 Border Guard Service of Belarus

Bulgaria
 Bulgaria Border Police

Croatia
 Croatian Border Police

Estonia
 Police and Border Guard Board

Finland
 Finnish Border Guard

France
 Directorate-General of Customs and Indirect Taxes
 Direction centrale de la police aux frontières
 Gendarmerie Nationale

Georgia
 Patrol Police Department (border control)
 Border Police of Georgia (border supervision)

Germany
 German Federal Police (formerly known as the Bundesgrenzschutz from 1951-2005)
 Bundeszollverwaltung (Federal Customs Service)

Ireland
 Garda Síochána
 Border Management Unit, Dept of Justice. BMU is responsible for Immigration at Dublin Airport

Italy
 Polizia di Stato
 Guardia di Finanza

Kyrgyzstan
 State Border Guard Service (Kyrgyz Republic)

Latvia
 State Border Guard

Liechtenstein
 Border and Customs Unit

Lithuania
 State Border Guard Service

Moldova
 Moldovan Border Police

Netherlands
 Royal Marechaussee

Norway
 Garnisonen i Sør-Varanger

Poland
 Border Guard (Poland) (Polish: Straż Graniczna)

Portugal
 Serviço de Estrangeiros e Fronteiras (Immigration and Border Service)
 Guarda Nacional Republicana (Unidade de Controlo Costeiro) (Border Surveillance)

Romania
 Romanian Border Police

Russia
 Border Guard Service of Russia (Russian: Пограничная служба России)

Spain
 National Police (border control, immigration, refuge and asylum, extradition and expulsion)
 Guardia Civil (border surveillance)

Sweden
 Swedish Police Authority

Switzerland
 Border Guard Corps (land borders and the airports of Basel (together with French Border police), Geneva and Lugano
 Cantonal police of Berne (at Bern-Belp airport)
 Cantonal police of Zurich (at Zurich airport)

Ukraine
 State Border Guard Service of Ukraine (Ukrainian: Державна Прикордонна Служба України)

United Kingdom
 Border Force

Guernsey
 Guernsey Border Agency

Jersey
 Customs and Immigration Service

North America

Canada
 Canada Border Services Agency

United States
 U.S. Customs and Border Protection
 U.S. Border Patrol

Oceania

Australia
 Australian Border Force

New Zealand
 Immigration New Zealand
 New Zealand Customs Service

South America

Colombia
 Migración Colombia

Defunct agencies

East Germany
 Grenztruppen der DDR

Soviet Union
 USSR Border Troops

Hungary
 Border Guard

References

National border guard agencies